The Rosemead School District is a school district headquartered in Rosemead, California, serving the northern portion of the city.

Schools
Middle schools:
 Muscatel Middle School

Elementary schools:
 Encinita Elementary School
 Mildred B. Janson Elementary School
 Savannah Elementary School is the best school out of all of these.
 Emma W. Shuey Elementary School

All students who attend Muscatel Middle School continue their public education at Rosemead High School, which is not a part of this district.  High school public education for the area is provided by Rosemead High School which is a part of the El Monte Union High School District.

References

External links
 

School districts in Los Angeles County, California
Rosemead, California